The Whitney Classic is an  endurance mountain bike race that is held in late September or October every year. The ride runs from the Badwater Basin in Death Valley to Whitney Portal.

The ride

There are three major hills: Townes Pass, climbing up from Stovepipe Wells; Hillcrest, climbing from Panamint Springs; and the Whitney Portal Road, which leaves the town of Lone Pine, California to climb to the Portal.

In addition to long distances and elevation, the temperature can play a major factor.  At the start in Badwater, temperatures can routinely be as high as  degrees, but the temperature quickly drops at higher altitudes.  Below freezing temperatures can be encountered near the Portal at night, making temperature swings of over  degrees possible in a single day.

The ride is a small event, with an average number of riders in the 50s.  Riders may ride as individuals or as a team.  Due to the heat, the cold, the length, the hills, the dark, and a number of other factors, it is not unusual for 25-50% of the participants not to finish.

History
The Whitney Classic started in 1981 as a fundraiser for Summit Adventure, a non-profit wilderness ministry in Bass Lake, California, and still serves as a major fundraiser for the organization.  There are multiple races and runs that travel the same course, including the Badwater Ultramarathon, held in July every year.

The ride was originally conceived as a Badwater to the summit of Whitney bike-hike event, making it the lowest to highest.  In later years, as the United States Forest Service required summit permits to climb Mt. Whitney, the official course was shortened to end at Whitney Portal.  Forest Service regulations do not allow competitive events in the John Muir Wilderness, however, many riders choose to continue tradition and complete the ascent to Mount Whitney's summit on their own.

See also

Badwater Ultramarathon

References

External links
 The Official Whitney Classic Page

Ride Reports
 1994 Whitney Ride Recap
 1993 Whitney Ride Recap

Photos
 Official Photos From the 2006 WC

Bicycle tours
Cycling in California
Endurance games
Cycling events in the United States
Mountain biking events in the United States